Michael "Spud" Firrito (born 27 November 1983) is a former professional Australian rules footballer who played for the North Melbourne Football Club in the Australian Football League (AFL). He made his AFL debut in round 12, 2003. Although he was primarily a defender, he had been used as a tagger occasionally.

In August 2016, North Melbourne announced they would not renew Firrito's contract for the 2017 season.

International Rules Series
Michael Firrito was selected by Mick Malthouse for 2008 International Rules series for Australia against Ireland. In the first Test, Firrito played as full back and right corner back before replacing Nathan Bock as goalkeeper for the second test, when he made many good saves despite conceding 4 goals. Firrito was one of 5 North Melbourne players selected in the squad, along with Daniel Wells, Drew Petrie, Brent Harvey and Matt Campbell.

Statistics

|- style="background-color: #EAEAEA"
! scope="row" style="text-align:center" | 2003
|style="text-align:center;"|
| 42 || 2 || 0 || 0 || 6 || 2 || 8 || 1 || 3 || 0.0 || 0.0 || 3.0 || 1.0 || 4.0 || 0.5 || 1.5
|-
! scope="row" style="text-align:center" | 2004
|style="text-align:center;"|
| 24 || 16 || 4 || 2 || 90 || 61 || 151 || 35 || 33 || 0.3 || 0.1 || 5.6 || 3.8 || 9.4 || 2.2 || 2.1
|- style="background-color: #EAEAEA"
! scope="row" style="text-align:center" | 2005
|style="text-align:center;"|
| 24 || 23 || 5 || 4 || 168 || 105 || 273 || 84 || 74 || 0.2 || 0.2 || 7.3 || 4.6 || 11.9 || 3.7 || 3.2
|-
! scope="row" style="text-align:center" | 2006
|style="text-align:center;"|
| 24 || 17 || 3 || 5 || 130 || 107 || 237 || 76 || 44 || 0.2 || 0.3 || 7.6 || 6.3 || 13.9 || 4.5 || 2.6
|- style="background-color: #EAEAEA"
! scope="row" style="text-align:center" | 2007
|style="text-align:center;"|
| 24 || 24 || 1 || 1 || 164 || 168 || 332 || 89 || 39 || 0.0 || 0.0 || 6.8 || 7.0 || 13.8 || 3.7 || 1.6
|-
! scope="row" style="text-align:center" | 2008
|style="text-align:center;"|
| 11 || 23 || 1 || 7 || 156 || 179 || 335 || 109 || 40 || 0.0 || 0.3 || 6.8 || 7.8 || 14.6 || 4.7 || 1.7
|- style="background-color: #EAEAEA"
! scope="row" style="text-align:center" | 2009
|style="text-align:center;"|
| 11 || 22 || 9 || 6 || 172 || 197 || 369 || 81 || 101 || 0.4 || 0.3 || 7.8 || 9.0 || 16.8 || 3.7 || 4.6
|-
! scope="row" style="text-align:center" | 2010
|style="text-align:center;"|
| 11 || 22 || 2 || 2 || 192 || 232 || 424 || 89 || 54 || 0.1 || 0.1 || 8.7 || 10.5 || 19.3 || 4.0 || 2.5
|- style="background-color: #EAEAEA"
! scope="row" style="text-align:center" | 2011
|style="text-align:center;"|
| 11 || 21 || 2 || 1 || 180 || 163 || 343 || 68 || 57 || 0.1 || 0.0 || 8.6 || 7.8 || 16.3 || 3.2 || 2.7
|-
! scope="row" style="text-align:center" | 2012
|style="text-align:center;"|
| 11 || 23 || 1 || 1 || 190 || 222 || 412 || 98 || 37 || 0.0 || 0.0 || 8.3 || 9.7 || 17.9 || 4.3 || 1.6
|- style="background-color: #EAEAEA"
! scope="row" style="text-align:center" | 2013
|style="text-align:center;"|
| 11 || 17 || 0 || 0 || 162 || 90 || 252 || 83 || 28 || 0.0 || 0.0 || 9.5 || 5.3 || 14.8 || 4.9 || 1.6
|-
! scope="row" style="text-align:center" | 2014
|style="text-align:center;"|
| 11 || 20 || 1 || 0 || 192 || 135 || 327 || 94 || 34 || 0.1 || 0.0 || 9.6 || 6.8 || 16.4 || 4.7 || 1.7
|- style="background-color: #EAEAEA"
! scope="row" style="text-align:center" | 2015
|style="text-align:center;"|
| 11 || 23 || 0 || 3 || 189 || 123 || 312 || 79 || 52 || 0.0 || 0.1 || 8.2 || 5.3 || 13.6 || 3.4 || 2.3
|-
! scope="row" style="text-align:center" | 2016
|style="text-align:center;"|
| 11 || 22 || 0 || 0 || 165 || 117 || 282 || 83 || 26 || 0.0 || 0.0 || 7.5 || 5.3 || 12.8 || 3.8 || 1.2
|- class="sortbottom"
! colspan=3| Career
! 275
! 29
! 32
! 2156
! 1901
! 4057
! 1069
! 622
! 0.1
! 0.1
! 7.8
! 6.9
! 14.8
! 3.9
! 2.3
|}

References

External links

North Melbourne Football Club players
Box Hill Football Club players
Australian rules footballers from Victoria (Australia)
1983 births
Living people
Eastern Ranges players
Australian people of Italian descent
Australia international rules football team players